Center for American Studies may refer to:

The Center for American Stuides at the Royal Library of Belgium
Heidelberg Center for American Studies
Various other institutes described at American studies